Panini may refer to:

People
 Giovanni Paolo Panini (1691–1765), Italian artist
 Carlos Panini (died 1951), Mexican businessman of Italian origin
 Manuel Panini (born 1983), Italian footballer
 Pāṇini (fl. 6th–4th century BCE), Sanskrit grammarian in ancient India
 Panini, a character in the animated television series Chowder

Companies and organisations
 Panini Group, an Italian company best known for its brand of collectible stickers
 Panini Comics, a publisher of comic books and magazines, part of Panini Group
 Panini Modena, the original name of Modena Volley, an Italian volleyball team

Other uses
 "Panini" (song), by American rapper Lil Nas X from his debut EP 7
 Panini (sandwich), a type of sandwich, Italian in origin
 Panini, an alternative taxonomical grouping posited to classify chimpanzees and bonobos
 Panini projection, a map projection used in image processing, named after Giovanni Paolo Panini
 Panini Rural Municipality, a municipality in Nepal

See also
 Panini (surname)
 Pani (disambiguation)
 Paganini (disambiguation)